Sachendi (earlier Chychendy) is a suburb in Kanpur, India, situated about 10 km from Kanpur on the NH 19 to Delhi. The population was 19,424 as of the 2011 census. It has a 76,20% literacy rate and is 7 km from Panki, a Kanpur suburb. It also comes under Kanpur Metropolitan Area.

Transportation
Sachendi has a bus station and UPSRTC Busses of Kanpur have routes from Sachendi to different localities.

Nearest Railway stations from Sachendi are Bhaupur railway station on the Kanpur-Delhi line and Bhimsen Jn. On the Kanpur-Jhansi line.

Kanpur Civil Airport is nearest airport.

Tourist attractions
The tourist hub of Kanpur is 10 km from the town.
Near by large village is Dharmangadpur.

References

Neighbourhoods in Kanpur